Operation Altair was the Canadian Forces maritime contribution to the U.S.-led coalition anti-terrorist campaign known as Operation Enduring Freedom (OEF). Operation Altair mainly consisted of single ship deployments. HMCS Toronto, a Halifax-class patrol frigate with an embarked helicopter detachment, was the first ship to sail under Operation Altair. She deployed from January to July 2004, sailing with the USS George Washington Carrier Strike Group. However, due to operational requirements elsewhere around the world, there were periods when there was no Canadian maritime contribution to OEF.

Additionally, Canada's military contribution to the international campaign against terrorism from October 2001 to October 2003 was known as Operation Apollo, which saw soldiers deployed in Kandahar, Afghanistan, and ships deployed in the Persian Gulf region as well.

The tasks performed under Operation Altair were subsequently carried out under Operation Saiph.

Deployments

January to July 2004 (Rotation 0): HMCS Toronto deployed from Halifax and operated with the USS George Washington Carrier Strike Group.

April to October 2005 (Rotation 1):  deployed from Esquimalt and operated with the U.S. Fifth Fleet

September 2006 to March 2007 (Rotation 2):  deployed from Esquimalt and operated with the  Expeditionary Strike Group.

November 2007 to April 2008 (Rotation 3):  deployed from Halifax and operated with the  Carrier Strike Group.

Commodore Bob Davidson commanded CTF 150 with his flag in HMCS Iroquois. HMCS Protecteur and HMCS Calgary returned to Esquimalt on 3 October 2008 having circumnavigated the globe during the operation, travelling through the Panama and Suez Canals.

External links
 https://web.archive.org/web/20051127145610/http://www.forces.gc.ca/site/operations/altair/index_e.asp
 CTV.ca

ALTAIR